On Philosophical Style is a short book by the American philosopher Brand Blanshard.  It originated in 1953 as the Adamson Lecture, given at the University of Manchester, and was subsequently published in 1954 by Manchester University Press. His most-praised book, its thesis is that obscurity of style in philosophical writing is antithetical to the chief aim of philosophy:  the elucidation and clarification of our most foundational and important concepts.  Nevertheless, as several examples make only too apparent, a number of great philosophers were not notably great writers.  Blanshard analyzes their most common shortcomings, and offers suggestions as to how these might be remedied.

Though On Philosophical Style can stand entirely on its own, it is perhaps best understood as part of Blanshard's greater metaphilosophical project which became clearer in 1962 with the publication of Reason and Analysis.  In that book Blanshard critiqued contemporary trends in philosophy, and went on to offer his own views on the nature and scope of philosophy.

Reviews

Notes 

1954 non-fiction books
Books about metaphilosophy
Books about writing
Manchester University Press books